On Listening to Louis Chen's Zither (Traditional Chinese: 聽陳蕾士的琴箏) is a poem  by the Hong Kong poet Wong Kwok Pun. In the poem, the poet uses synesthesia to describe his audial experiences. The poem has been included as an essential text in Hong Kong secondary school textbooks since the 1990s. Wong apologised to students in 2006, for many students consider the poem too difficult to be understood for examination in the HKCEE subject of Chinese Language. Since 2007, students no longer need to study the poem for HKCEE.

External links
The poet's "apology"

Chinese poems